Wilfredo León Venero (born 31 July 1993) is a Cuban–Polish professional volleyball player. He was a member of the Cuba national team from 2007 to 2012, and is a current member of the Poland national team and Sir Safety Perugia. A silver medallist at the 2010 World Championship, and a two–time NORCECA Champion (2009, 2011).

Considered by many as one of a kind, he led Cuba to the silver medal at the 2010 World Championship held in Italy, alongside Yoandy Leal and Robertlandy Simon. He is considered one of the leaders of the "Generation of Miracle" of Cuban volleyball and by many experts. Wilfredo León is considered one of the best volleyball players worldwide.

Personal life
Wilfredo León Venero was born in Santiago de Cuba, Cuba on July 31, 1993. He is the son of Wilfredo León Hechavarría and Alina Venero Boza (former volleyball player). He studied at Escuela Nacional del Voleibol Cubano. León Venero lived in Poland for a while with his Polish girlfriend. On June 24, 2016 he married Małgorzata (born Gronkowska). On May 13, 2017 their daughter Natalia was born.

Career
He started to play when he was 7. His first coach was his mother Alina Venero. Wilfredo León Venero debuted in the Cuban national team on May 24, 2008 in Düsseldorf, aged 14 years and 10 months. He won the title of Best Receiver at World League 2009. On July 31, 2009 he won a silver medal in the World U21 Championship 2009 (after losing the final against Brazil). In 2009, the Cuban national team, with Leon, won the title of NORCECA Champion (and three individual awards) and repeated this success in 2011. After losing the final against Brazil, Cuba won a silver medal at the World Championship 2010. He was the youngest captain of the national team (he was 17). In 2012, he won bronze medal of World League - Sofia 2012.

In 2013, León left Cuba to play in a club outside of his homeland, losing the possibility of playing for the Cuban national team. He joined Russian club Zenit Kazan in 2014, where he won multiple CEV Champions League, national leagues and cups. He also played part-time with Qatar club Al Rayyan in 2015 and 2016. In September 2018, León joined Italian team SIR Safety Perugia.

On July 14, 2015 he received Polish citizenship, and five years later he became fully eligible to play for the Polish national volleyball team.

Honours

Clubs
 CEV Champions League
  2014/2015 – with Zenit Kazan
  2015/2016 – with Zenit Kazan
  2016/2017 – with Zenit Kazan
  2017/2018 – with Zenit Kazan

 FIVB Club World Championship
  Poland 2017 – with Zenit Kazan
  Betim 2022 – with Sir Safety Perugia

 National championships
 2008/2009  Cuban Championship, with Capitalinos
 2009/2010  Cuban Championship, with Capitalinos
 2010/2011  Cuban Championship, with Orientales de Santiago
 2014/2015  Russian Cup, with Zenit Kazan
 2014/2015  Russian Championship, with Zenit Kazan
 2015/2016  Russian SuperCup, with Zenit Kazan
 2015/2016  Russian Cup, with Zenit Kazan
 2015/2016  Russian Championship, with Zenit Kazan
 2016/2017  Russian SuperCup, with Zenit Kazan
 2016/2017  Russian Cup, with Zenit Kazan
 2016/2017  Russian Championship, with Zenit Kazan
 2017/2018  Russian SuperCup, with Zenit Kazan
 2017/2018  Russian Cup, with Zenit Kazan
 2017/2018  Russian Championship, with Zenit Kazan
 2018/2019  Italian Cup, with Sir Safety Perugia
 2019/2020  Italian SuperCup, with Sir Safety Perugia
 2020/2021  Italian SuperCup, with Sir Safety Perugia
 2021/2022  Italian Cup, with Sir Safety Perugia
 2022/2023  Italian SuperCup, with Sir Safety Perugia

Individual awards
 2009: FIVB World League – Best Server
 2009: NORCECA Championship – Best Spiker
 2009: NORCECA Championship – Most Valuable Player
 2011: Pan American Games – Most Valuable Player
 2011: NORCECA Championship – Best Spiker
 2011: NORCECA Championship – Best Scorer
 2015: CEV Champions League – Best Outside Spiker
 2015: CEV Champions League – Most Valuable Player
 2015: FIVB Club World Championship – Best Outside Spiker
 2016: CEV Champions League – Best Outside Spiker
 2016: CEV Champions League – Most Valuable Player
 2016: FIVB Club World Championship – Best Outside Spiker
 2017: CEV Champions League – Best Outside Spiker
 2017: FIVB Club World Championship – Best Outside Spiker
 2018: CEV Champions League – Best Outside Spiker
 2019: CEV European Championship – Best Outside Spiker
 2022:  FIVB Club World Championship – Best Outside Spiker

Record
 138 km/h serve speed

References

External links

 
 Player profile at LegaVolley.it 
 
 
 Player profile at Volleybox.net

1993 births
Living people
Sportspeople from Santiago de Cuba
Naturalized citizens of Poland
Cuban men's volleyball players
Polish men's volleyball players
Olympic volleyball players of Poland
Volleyball players at the 2010 Summer Youth Olympics
Volleyball players at the 2011 Pan American Games
Volleyball players at the 2020 Summer Olympics
Pan American Games medalists in volleyball
Pan American Games silver medalists for Cuba
Youth Olympic gold medalists for Cuba
Medalists at the 2011 Pan American Games
Expatriate volleyball players in Russia
Expatriate volleyball players in Qatar
Cuban expatriate sportspeople in Italy
Expatriate volleyball players in Italy
VC Zenit Kazan players
Outside hitters